Dörtyol Gençlerbirliği is a football club located in Dörtyol near Hatay, southern Turkey. The team competes in Turkish Regional Amateur League.

League participations
Turkish Regional Amateur League: 2014–present

League performances

Source: TFF: Dörtyol Gençlerbirliği

References

External links 
Dörtyol Gençlerbirliği on TFF.org

Football clubs in Hatay